Brassavola is a genus of 21 orchids (family Orchidaceae). They were named in 1813 by the Scottish botanist Robert Brown. The name comes from the Italian nobleman and physician Antonio Musa Brassavola. This genus is abbreviated B. in trade journals.

These species are widespread across Mexico, Central America, the West Indies and  South America. They are epiphytes, and a few are lithophytes. A single, apical and succulent leaf grows on an elongated pseudobulb.

The orchid yields a single white or greenish white flower, or a raceme of a few flowers. The three sepals and two lateral petals are greenish, narrow and long. The base of the broad, sometimes fringed lip partially enfolds the column. This column has a pair of falciform (sickle-shaped) ears on each side of the front and contains twelve (sometimes eight) pollinia.

Most Brassavola orchids are very fragrant, attracting pollinators with their citrusy smell. But they are only fragrant at night, in order to attract the right moth. Longevity of flowers depends on the species and is between five and thirty days.

In 1698 Brassavola nodosa was the first tropical orchid to be brought from the Caribbean island Curaçao to Holland. Thus began the propagation of this orchid and the fascination for orchids in general.

Taxonomy
The species of Brassavola have been divided into four sections:

B. sect. Brassavola
This monotypic section, erected by H. G. Jones in 1969, contains the type of the genus:

B. sect. Sessilabia
This section, erected by Rolfe in 1902, is characterized by narrow labella with fimbriate margins to wider labella with entire margins.

B. sect. Cuneilabia
This section, erected by Rolfe in 1902, is characterized by narrowly constricted labellum bases.  The sectional type is B. nodosa

B. sect. Lateraliflorae
This section, erected by H.G.Jones in 1975, is characterized by laterally-borne inflorescences.  The sectional type is B. acaulis

Greges and hybrid genera
Brassavola is in the same alliance as the genera Cattleya and Laelia.  They have been used extensively in hybridization and represent the "B" at the beginning of the names of such crosses. For example, Blc. is × Brassolaeliocattleya.
B. Little Stars, a primary hybrid between B. nodosa and B. subulifolia
× Rhynchovola 'David Sanders', a primary intergeneric hybrid between B. cucullata and  Rhyncholaelia digbyana.  Rhyncholaelia digbyana was formerly classified as a Brassavola; its hybrids have now been reclassified.
× Brassocattleya 'Yellow Bird' = × Brassocattleya 'Richard Mueller × B. nodosa
× Brassocattleya 'Richard Mueller' is a primary intergeneric hybrid between B. nodosa and C. milleri.  C. milleri was formerly classified as a Laelia until it was transferred into Sophronitis which was then sunk into Cattleya to avoid confusion.

References

External links
 
 

 
Laeliinae genera
Epiphytic orchids